James Edgcumbe, D.D. (b Tavistock 17 December 1705; d Oxford 16 May 1750) was an Oxford college head.

Edgcumbe was educated at Exeter College, Oxford and became a Fellow in 1728. He was Rector from 1731 until his death. An ordained Anglican priest, he held the living at Barwick-in-Elmet.

References

Alumni of Exeter College, Oxford
Rectors of Exeter College, Oxford
Fellows of Exeter College, Oxford
1705 births
1750 deaths
18th-century English Anglican priests
People from Tavistock